Younes El Aynaoui was the defending champion but lost in the final 6–2, 2–6, 6–1 against Julien Boutter.

Seeds

  Younes El Aynaoui (final)
  Paul-Henri Mathieu (first round)
  Arnaud Clément (first round)
  Dominik Hrbatý (semifinals)
  Olivier Rochus (first round)
  Fernando Vicente (first round)
  Sargis Sargsian (no show)
  André Sá (first round)''

Draw

Finals

Top half

Bottom half

External links
 2003 Grand Prix Hassan II Draw

2003 ATP Tour
2003 Grand Prix Hassan II